Elias Salomonsson (born August 31, 2004) is a Swedish ice hockey defenceman playing for Skellefteå AIK of the Swedish Hockey League (SHL). Salomonsson was selected by the Winnipeg Jets in the second round, 55th pick overall, of the 2022 NHL Entry Draft.

External links

2004 births
Living people
People from Skellefteå Municipality
Skellefteå AIK players
Swedish ice hockey defencemen
Winnipeg Jets draft picks